is a Japanese rower. He competed at the 2004 Summer Olympics, 2008 Summer Olympics and the 2012 Summer Olympics.

References

1975 births
Living people
Japanese male rowers
Olympic rowers of Japan
Rowers at the 2004 Summer Olympics
Rowers at the 2008 Summer Olympics
Rowers at the 2012 Summer Olympics
Sportspeople from Fukuoka Prefecture
Asian Games medalists in rowing
Rowers at the 1998 Asian Games
Rowers at the 2002 Asian Games
Asian Games gold medalists for Japan
Asian Games silver medalists for Japan
Medalists at the 1998 Asian Games
Medalists at the 2002 Asian Games